Sašo Lazarevski (born 24 March 1978 in Bitola) is a Macedonian retired footballer who last played as a defender for FK Mladost Carev Dvor in Second Macedonian Football League.

International career
He made his senior debut for Macedonia in a November 2001 friendly match away against Hungary and has earned a total of 10 caps, scoring no goals. His final international was a June 2005 FIFA World Cup qualification match against Armenia.

Honours

Pelister
 Macedonian Second League: 2011–12

Sileks
 Macedonian Second League: 2013–14

References

External links

Football Federation of Macedonia  
Macedonian Football 

1978 births
Living people
Sportspeople from Bitola
Association football defenders
Macedonian footballers
Tennis Borussia Berlin players
FK Belasica players
PFC Marek Dupnitsa players
FK Bregalnica Štip players
PFC Lokomotiv Plovdiv players
FK Vëllazërimi 77 players
FK Rabotnički players
FK Milano Kumanovo players
FK Pelister players
FK Napredok players
FK Sileks players
FK Mladost Carev Dvor players
Regionalliga players
Macedonian First Football League players
First Professional Football League (Bulgaria) players
Macedonian expatriate footballers
Expatriate footballers in Germany
Macedonian expatriate sportspeople in Germany
Expatriate footballers in Bulgaria
Macedonian expatriate sportspeople in Bulgaria
North Macedonia international footballers